The following elections occurred in the year 1910.

Africa
 South African general election

Europe
 1910 Bosnian parliamentary election
 1910 Croatian parliamentary election
 Danish Folketing election
 Danish Landsting election
 Finnish parliamentary election
 French legislative election
 Greek legislative election
 Spanish general election

United Kingdom
 January 1910 United Kingdom general election
 List of MPs elected in the January 1910 United Kingdom general election
 1910 Barnstaple by-election
 December 1910 United Kingdom general election
 List of MPs elected in the December 1910 United Kingdom general election
 1910 Govan by-election
 List of United Kingdom MPs who only sat in the February–November 1910 Parliament
 1910 Reading by-election
 1910 Rotherham by-election
 1910 Shipley by-election
 1910 Swansea District by-election

America
 Argentine general election
 Brazilian presidential election
 Chilean presidential election
 Guatemalan presidential election

Canada
 1910 Edmonton municipal election
 1910 Manitoba general election
 1910 Toronto municipal election

United States
 United States House of Representatives elections in California, 1910
 1910 California gubernatorial election
 1910 Minnesota gubernatorial election
 1910 New York state election
 United States House of Representatives elections in South Carolina, 1910
 1910 South Carolina gubernatorial election
 1910 United States House of Representatives elections
 1910 and 1911 United States Senate elections

United States Senate
 United States Senate election in Massachusetts, 1910
 1910 United States Senate elections

Oceania

Australia
 1910 Australian federal election
 1910 Kooyong by-election
 1910 Australian referendum
 1910 South Australian state election

New Zealand
 1910 Auckland East by-election

See also
 :Category:1910 elections

1910
Elections